Lyneal Alston (born July 23, 1964) is a former professional American football wide receiver who played in the National Football League (NFL).

External links
NFL.com profile

1964 births
Living people
Sportspeople from Mobile, Alabama
Players of American football from Alabama
American football wide receivers
Pittsburgh Steelers players
Southern Miss Golden Eagles football players
University of Southern Mississippi alumni
National Football League replacement players